Heuser is a German surname. Notable people with the surname include:

Beatrice Heuser (born 1961), German historian and political scientist
Harro Heuser (1927–2011), German mathematician
Herman Heuser (1872–1933), American Roman Catholic priest and writer
John Heuser (born 1942), American biophysicist
Jürgen Heuser (born 1953), German weightlifter
Klaus Heuser (born 1957), German musician
Loni Heuser (1908–1999), German actress
Ursula Heuser, also known as Ursula Benser (1915–2001), German painter
Werner Heuser (1880–1964), German painter and professor

See also
Heuser Nunatak, nunatak of Victoria Land, Antarctica

German-language surnames